Edward William Bonney (August 26, 1807 – February 4, 1864) was a 19th-century adventurer, miller, hotel keeper, city planner, counterfeiter, livery stable keeper, bounty hunter, private detective, postmaster, merchant, soldier, and author.  He is best known for his undercover work in exposing the "Banditti of the Prairie", resulting from his investigation of the torture-murder of noted Illinois pioneer and frontiersman, Colonel George Davenport.

Early life
Edward William Bonney was born and raised in Hittsboro, Essex County, New York.

Founding of Bonneyville, Indiana
Edward Bonney got married and moved to the frontier, in Elkhart County, Indiana, in 1837, with the intent of creating the city of Bonneyville, named after himself. In 1839, he was charged and fined for assault.  Bonney built the Bonneyville Mill for grinding grain into flour and also built a saw mill. When Bonneyville failed to grow rapidly from a sleepy farm town into a bustling city, Bonney sold his most of the 80 acres he had purchased for his planned city in 1841. He later bought the Goshen Hotel in Bonneyville and not long after sold the hotel and both his mills.

Arrest for alleged counterfeiting
After being arrested in 1842 for allegedly being a counterfeiter, Bonney escaped from custody while being transported under armed guard for trial in Indianapolis. Bonney immediately left Indiana and traveled to Illinois.

Mormon affiliation and offices held in Nauvoo, Illinois
Bonney eventually "fiddle-footed his way" to Nauvoo, Illinois, in 1844, a Latter Day Saint community on the Mississippi River, where he and his wife decided to settle. Between March 14 and April 11, 1844, he was chosen by Joseph Smith, the founder and leader of the Church of Jesus Christ of Latter Day Saints, who was a friend, to be a member of the Mormon theocratic "Council of Fifty. He was one of three non-members on the Mormon Council that made important government and community decisions for the Nauvoo Saints. Bonney was chosen by Smith to be his aide-de-camp in the Nauvoo Legion from June 18 to June 27, until the murder of Smith.

After the murders of Joseph and Hyrum Smith in Carthage, Illinois, in 1844, Bonney, who as a non-Mormon was considered an outsider by the Nauvoo church elders, lost his influential status among the Council of Fifty. He was released from his Council duties on February 4, 1845,  and he left for Iowa. Bonney continued to be involved in fighting against criminal elements both outside and within the Nauvoo Mormon community. Bonney was also particularly antagonistic of the Mormon Danites.

Bounty hunter and amateur detective in Montrose, Iowa Territory
In 1845, Edward Bonney moved across the Mississippi River from Nauvoo to Montrose, Lee County, Iowa Territory, now Montrose, Lee County, Iowa, where he operated a livery stable. During the next several years, he worked with law enforcement agencies, in Montrose and Lee County, to hunt down various criminals, in the area, as a sort of freelance bounty hunter. Bonney gradually attained a reputation as a skilled detective, adept at "piecing together odd bits of information and rumor", although he was often subject to suspicion and persecution for his Mormonism.

Investigations of the Banditti of the Prairie and the murderers of Colonel Davenport
The criminal investigations of Edward Bonney into the criminal activity occurring along the vast mid-river area of the Mississippi between 1843-1848, attributed to the organization known as the "Banditti of the Prairie", were claimed by Bonney to being carried out by outlaws who considered themselves "self-styled" Mormons conveniently seeking refuge in Nauvoo as persecuted "Saints" where they headquartered their criminal activities unhindered by law enforcement. It was not until going undercover within the organization, posing as a counterfeiter, that he was able to connect the gang to the torture-murder of Colonel George Davenport. After a four-month chase through Illinois, Missouri, Indiana and Ohio, he finally brought most of his murderers to justice. Of the eight men taken into custody, three of the four men involved in Davenport's murder, Granville Young and brothers John and Aaron Long, were convicted and hanged. The fourth man, Robert H. Birch, agreed to turn state's evidence and later escaped from jail. After learning "crime doesn't pay" Birch finally became an honest man and twelve years later, was one of the founders of the Pinos Altos gold mining camp in 1858 in the New Mexico Territory.

Publication of the Banditti of the Prairies
In 1850, Edward Bonney wrote and published a sensational account of the Banditti of the Prairie, titled The Banditti of the Prairies: or, The murderer's doom, a tale of Mississippi Valley and the Far West, which was an immediate success and went through eight  editions until 1858. Although, it is thought Bonney may have been assisted by a ghost writer, most likely Henry A. Clark, the book, though poorly written, by an amateur writer, is considered remarkably accurate, when compared with official court records and other official evidence.  The Bonney book was not specifically anti-Mormon, but reflected his criticism of organized religion.

Life after Colonel Davenport trial
Following the trial and execution of Granville Young and the Long brothers, Edward Bonney returned to Lee County, Iowa Territory the following year and was indicted by the local district court for murder and later acquitted. Bonney lived in Rock Island, Illinois for a time and before moving to Chicago in Prospect Park in DuPage County where he was appointed as the second postmaster of the town. before settling in Aurora, Illinois around 1852.

Detective in Chicago
.

American Civil War service
In 1862, Edward Bonney was living in Chicago, Cook County, Illinois and continued working, as a bounty hunter and detective.  In the same year, during the height of the American Civil War, Bonney, at age 56, enlisted into Captain John S. Williams Company G, 127th Illinois Volunteer Infantry Regiment, of the Union Army and participated in General Grant's Mississippi River Campaign, which included the Siege of Vicksburg, Mississippi, where he received a paralyzing leg wound.  He was sent to the U.S. Marine Hospital, in St. Louis, Missouri, to recover from his severe wound.

Death
Private Edward Bonney was medically discharged, from the Union Army, on December 23, 1863 and went back to Chicago, dying on February 4, 1864, as the result of his crippling leg wound. Bonney was buried in Bonneyville Cemetery, Bristol, Elkhart County, Indiana, near the mill and town that he once owned.

See also
Joseph Naper (city planner)

References

Further reading

Glaser, Lynn. Counterfeiting in America: The History of an American Way to Wealth. New York: Crown Publishers, 1968.
Lott, Frank Luther. Literature of Pioneer Life in Iowa. Iowa City: State Historical Society of Iowa, 1923.
Morgan, Dale Lowell. The Humboldt: Highroad of the West. Lincoln: University of Nebraska Press, 1985. 
Richman, Irving Berdine. Ioway to Iowa: The Genesis of a Corn and Bible Commonwealth. Iowa City: State Historical Society of Iowa, 1931.
Russell, Charles Edward. A-rafting on the Mississip'''. Minneapolis: University of Minnesota Press, 2001. 
Williams, Kenny J. Prairie Voices: A Literary History of Chicago from the Frontier to 1893''. Nashville: Townsend Press, 1980.

External links
 Edward William Bonney – Biography - The Joseph Smith Papers
 "Edward Bonney, who built Bonneyville Mill, led an adventurous life after leaving Elkhart County (Indiana)", The Elkhart Truth, Elkhart County Historical Museum
 Pvt Edward Bonney (1807 - 1864) - Find A Grave Memorial
 Edward Bonney U.S. Civil War Service Record
 Bonneyville Mill County Park, Elkhart County, Indiana

1807 births
1864 deaths
People from Essex County, New York
People from Nauvoo, Illinois
People from Iowa
Private detectives and investigators
Union Army soldiers
Union military personnel killed in the American Civil War